Jawahar Navodaya Vidyalaya, Veleru is one of the approximately 661 Jawahar Navodaya Vidyalayas in India, located in Veleru village, Bapulapadu mandal near Hanuman Junction in Andhra Pradesh. It was established in 1989 by the Department of Education, MHRD.| Jawahar Navodaya Vidyalayas were planned to set up in all the districts of the country in order to provide an education to children from predominantly rural areas. They form a part of the system of gifted education.

Objectives of JNV schools
To provide CBSE education
To promote national integration among students through a policy of migration
To encourage and promote talent predominantly from rural areas and weaker sections
To function as a pace setter institution in the district
To inculcate all-around development, i.e., excelling in academics, music, games, SUPW, art in all aspects.

History
The school was established in 1989, and 32 acres of land for establishing the school is donated by Sri. Donavalli Gurunatham garu and Smt. Donavalli Balamma garu.

Academics

The school provides education from the 6th to the 12th standard. An entrance test is conducted and 80 students are selected every year from 5th standard at district level. This exam comprises three parts and a total of 100 questions-50 questions of mental ability, 25 questions of English / regional language, 25 questions from mathematics.

In 8th standard also exam will be conducted if any seats are remaining which is known as lateral entry. 

If any seats are remaining in 11th class these seats are filled by interview and 10th class marks.

The school follows the Central Board of Secondary Education-C.B.S.E syllabus and N.C.E.R.T textbooks. Medium of instruction: English.

Academics are wonderful which are taught by very highly qualified teachers and with the help digital classroom.

In +1 & +2 Science groups M.P.C. (Math, Physics, Chemistry), Bi.P.C. (Biology, Physics, Chemistry) and M.Bi.P.C. are taught.

Student life
All costs are paid by the Government of India. Everything is provided by the school to help the poor social and economic background of students.

Hostels
There are hostels for both boys and girls in four houses named Aravali, Nilagiri, Shivalik, Udayagiri. They are separate for juniors and seniors as well as boys and girls.

Sports
There is a gymnasium and grounds for volleyball, basketball, badminton and football, kabaddi, kho-kho, table tennis. Students go for inter-school meets and clusters and if they excel they ca also participate in SGFI level.

Migration
About 30% of students in class IX are migrated to and from JNV Vaishali of Bihar on the event of National Integration to promote understanding of the diversity and plurality of India's cultures and people.

Co-Curricular activities
In addition to the regular science topics (Mathematics, Science, Social Studies, English, Hindi and Telugu), students are trained in Music, Art and Painting, Computer Science Education and SUPW. Youth Parliament sessions are conducted.

Many inter-house competitions are held in afternoon session like essay writing, painting, slogan writing, debate, singing, story writing, skit competitions are held in this campus to ensure all round development  of student.

Social Services
Guiding programs are carried out by NCC. Students are trained for passing the 'A Certificate' in NCC.
Clean & Green programs in nearby villages, helping Old-Age Homes, donations, etc. are undertaken.
Scouts and guides can participate in rajya-puraskar camp.

References

External links
Official website
Navodaya Vidyalaya Samiti

Jawahar Navodaya Vidyalayas in Andhra Pradesh
Schools in Krishna district
Educational institutions established in 1989
1989 establishments in Andhra Pradesh